R. Visweswaran (1944–2007) was an Indian classical musician who played the santoor.

Visweswaran belongs to a family of musicians, and is the nephew of G.N. Balasubramaniam. He is trained to play Hindustani music on the santoor by Shivkumar Sharma. He performed internationally was a graded artist of All India Radio.

References

http://www.narthaki.com/info/intervw/intrvw3.html

1944 births
2007 deaths
Carnatic instrumentalists
Hindustani instrumentalists
Santoor players
20th-century Indian musicians
Recipients of the Rajyotsava Award 2005